Dimethylaminopropylamine (DMAPA) is a diamine used in the preparation of some surfactants, such as cocamidopropyl betaine which is an ingredient in many personal care products including soaps, shampoos, and cosmetics. BASF, a major producer, claims that DMAPA-derivatives do not sting the eyes and makes a fine-bubble foam, making it appropriate in shampoos.

Preparation and reactions
DMAPA is commonly produced commercially via the reaction between dimethylamine and acrylonitrile (a Michael reaction) to produce dimethylaminopropionitrile. A subsequent hydrogenation step yields DMAPA:

DMAPA is readily converted to the mustard dimethylaminopropyl-3-chloride, a powerful alkylating agent.

Health effects
Dimethylaminopropylamine is a known skin irritant and its presence as an impurity in cocamidopropyl betaine is thought to be the cause of irritation experienced by some individuals.

See also
 1,1-Dimethylethylenediamine
 1,2-Dimethylethylenediamine

References

Diamines
Dimethylamino compounds